Charles James Fox BA (c. 1827 – 14 March 1903) was a newspaper editor and owner in Australia.

History
Little is known of his earlier life, but he was brought up as a Roman Catholic and graduated BA from St John's College, Oxford.

He emigrated to Adelaide, South Australia, and married Mary Ann Toole on 31 October 1866.

He was Latin master at John Lorenzo Young's Adelaide Educational Institution from 1868 to 1871 or later.

Fox was involved in various Catholic lay organizations: he was hon. sec. of the committee to erect a memorial to Fr. J. N. Hinterocker SJ (c. 1820–1872)
He succeeded Benjamin Hoare as editor of The Irish Harp and Farmers' Herald in January 1870. 
in which paper he notably criticised Bishop Sheil's excommunication of Mary MacKillop. and was ousted from the South Australian Catholic Association, of which he was president. and founding member.
He retired as editor around August 1875. to concentrate on an agency he was running at 71 King William Street, Adelaide.

In 1883 he moved to Hobart, Tasmania, where he edited the Tasmanian Mail. He left for New South Wales in June 1888

He purchased the Northern Argus of Narrabri, New South Wales, which he ran as proprietor and editor. 
On 29 August 1890 fire destroyed the building, owned by a Mr. Spencer, and its contents, all of which were owned by Fox: a steam engine and two presses, good quality type and consumables. Despite rumors, an inquest found no evidence of arson. Fox had a court case pending in which he was being sued for publishing a libel.

He was appointed editor of the Cairns Argus in May 1899, and was still editor in February 1903, when he sprained his ankle as the result of a fall and was hospitalised in Townsville. He died there a week later.

Family
Sir Frank Fox (born 10 August 1874), author and editor of The Lone Hand (and much else) was a son.

References 

1827 births
1903 deaths
Australian newspaper editors
Australian Roman Catholics